The men's 'Individual Aero Kickboxing without Step' category involved just three men from three countries across two continents - Europe and North America.  Each contestant went through five performances (1.5 to 2 minutes each) with the totals added up at the end of the event.  All three men were guaranteed medals with France's Kevin Moroy claiming gold, Italian Daniele Desantis silver, and Canadian Eric Dubois bronze.

Results

See also
List of WAKO Amateur World Championships
List of WAKO Amateur European Championships
List of male kickboxers

References

External links
 WAKO World Association of Kickboxing Organizations Official Site

Kickboxing events at the WAKO World Championships 2007 Coimbra
2007 in kickboxing
Kickboxing in Portugal